Brienne-la-Vieille is a commune in the Aube department in north-central France.

The commune is bordered to the north by Brienne-le-Château in southern Champagne, and is traversed by the river Aube. It lies to the north of Lake Amance in the Parc naturel régional de la Forêt d'Orient, one of the regional natural parks of France.

Population

Administration
Previous mayors:
  Benoit Cerf, elected 2001, re-elected 2008.

See also
 Communes of the Aube department
 Parc naturel régional de la Forêt d'Orient

References

Communes of Aube
Aube communes articles needing translation from French Wikipedia